6 Corps, 6th Corps, Sixth Corps, or VI Corps may refer to:

France
 VI Cavalry Corps (Grande Armée), a cavalry formation of the Imperial French army during the Napoleonic Wars
 VI Corps (Grande Armée), a formation of the Imperial French army during the Napoleonic Wars

Germany
 VI Cavalry Corps (German Empire), a formation of the Imperial German Army during World War I
 VI Corps (German Empire), a formation of the Imperial German Army prior to and during World War I
 VI Reserve Corps (German Empire), a formation of the Imperial German Army during World War I
 VI Army Corps (Wehrmacht), World War II

United States
 VI Corps (United States)
 VI Corps (Union Army), a formation of the Union (North) during the American Civil War
 Sixth Army Corps (Spanish–American War)

Others
 VI Corps (Ottoman Empire)
 VI Corps (North Korea)
 VI Corps (United Kingdom) a formation of the British Army during World War I
 VI Corps, part of Ground Operations Command, South Korea

See also
 List of military corps by number